In enzymology, a benzoyl-CoA reductase is an enzyme that catalyzes the chemical reaction

benzoyl-CoA + reduced acceptor + 2 ATP + 2 H2O  cyclohexa-1,5-diene-1-carbonyl-CoA + acceptor + 2 ADP + 2 phosphate

The 4 substrates of this enzyme are benzoyl-CoA, reduced acceptor, ATP, and H2O, whereas its 4 products are cyclohexa-1,5-diene-1-carbonyl-CoA, acceptor, ADP, and phosphate.

This enzyme belongs to the family of oxidoreductases, specifically those acting on the CH-CH group of donor with other acceptors.  The systematic name of this enzyme class is cyclohexa-1,5-diene-1-carbonyl-CoA:acceptor oxidoreductase (aromatizing, ATP-forming). This enzyme is also called benzoyl-CoA reductase (dearomatizing).  This enzyme participates in benzoate degradation via CoA ligation.  It has two cofactors: manganese,  and magnesium.

References

 

EC 1.3.7
Manganese enzymes
Magnesium enzymes
Enzymes of unknown structure